Prince Ofori Yartey (born 6 October 1988) is a retired Beninese football central defender who plays for TJ Slovan Brvnište.

Club career
The Ghanaian born defender began his senior career with Liberty Professionals in the Ghanaian Premier League at age seventeen.
He signed for Slovakian club MŠK Žilina in July 2006. He made his Corgoň Liga debut in the 3–0 away win against Spartak Trnava on 3 October 2006. Then he was injured at winter training camp. Prince broke the cruciate ligament on knee and had to undergo three surgeries. He returned against Tatran Prešov on 5 December 2009. He joined FC Petržalka 1898 on loan for first half of the 2010–11 season and overall played 15 games. In January 2011, he came back to Žilina.

References

External links
 
 Eurofotbal profile
 MŠK Žilina profile

1988 births
Living people
Footballers from Accra
Association football central defenders
Beninese footballers
Beninese expatriate footballers
Soleil FC players
MŠK Žilina players
FC Petržalka players
TJ Stráža players
Slovak Super Liga players
3. Liga (Slovakia) players
4. Liga (Slovakia) players
5. Liga players
MFK Karviná players
Czech National Football League players
Expatriate footballers in Slovakia
Beninese expatriate sportspeople in Slovakia
Beninese expatriate sportspeople in the Czech Republic
Expatriate footballers in the Czech Republic